

Lakeland High School 
Lakeland High School may refer to:

Lakeland High School (Florida), Lakeland, Florida
Lakeland High School (Idaho), Rathdrum, Idaho
Lakeland Junior/Senior High School (Indiana), LaGrange, Indiana
Lakeland High School (Maryland), Lakeland, Maryland, now in College Park
Lakeland High School (Michigan), White Lake Township, Michigan
Lakeland High School (Missouri), Deepwater, Missouri
Lakeland High School (Shrub Oak, New York), Shrub Oak, New York
Lakeland Junior Senior High School, Lakeland School District,  Jermyn, Pennsylvania
Lakeland High School (Virginia), Suffolk, Virginia

Lakeland High School may also refer to:
Lakeland Regional High School, Wanaque, New Jersey
Lakeland Union High School, Minocqua, Wisconsin

Lakeland School District 
Lakeland school district may refer to:
Lakeland School District (Pennsylvania), a public school district located in northern Lackawanna County, Pennsylvania
Lakeland Central School District, a public school district in New York State
Lakeland School System, a municipal school district in Lakeland, Tennessee in Greater Memphis

See also 
Lakeland College (disambiguation)
Lakeland (disambiguation)